Frederick Boreham (7 June 1888 – 1 February 1966) was Archdeacon of Cornwall and Chaplain to Her Majesty Queen Elizabeth II.

Career
Boreham served as a Missionary in China from 1917 to 1924 and again from 1928 to 1934. He was vicar of Holy Trinity Hull from 1937 to 1947. He also served as Archdeacon of Western Szechwan prior to his appointment as Archdeacon of Cornwall. He became a chaplain to Queen Elizabeth II on the occasion of her coronation on 5 August 1952, and remained in that post until his death in 1966. There is a memorial to him at Truro Cathedral.

Personal life
Boreham married Mildred Slater and had four children, three of whom survived into adulthood: Peter, Cicely and John.

See also
 Anglicanism in Sichuan

Notes

20th-century English Anglican priests
Archdeacons of Cornwall
1888 births
1966 deaths
Archdeacons of Western Szechwan
Anglican missionaries in Sichuan